Anton Vasilyevich Labutin (born 23 November 1987) is a former Russian professional football player.

Club career
He played in the Russian Football National League for FC Gazovik Orenburg in 2011.

External links
 
 

1987 births
Living people
Russian footballers
Association football goalkeepers
FC Orenburg players
FC Sever Murmansk players
FC Nosta Novotroitsk players